Gett, previously known as GetTaxi, is an Israeli B2B Ground Transportation Management (GTM) platform and marketplace, and B2C ride-hailing app headquartered in London, and owned by GT GetTaxi (UK) Limited 

Founded in 2010, Gett has raised more than $750 million in funding to date, from Pelham Capital, Access Industries, Vostok New Ventures Global, Rakuten, MCI Capital, and others, including $300 million from the Volkswagen Group. It employs over 800 employees globally. As of Q4, 2022 Gett’s marketplace counted more than 2000 partner fleets.

History

GetTaxi was founded by Israeli entrepreneurs Shahar Waiser and Roi More. In the summer of 2009, Waiser came up with the idea during a thirty-minute wait for a taxi to the airport in Palo Alto, California. GetTaxi's beta version in Hebrew started operating in Tel Aviv two years later, in the summer of 2011, and the service was launched in London in August 2011.

In March 2012, GetTaxi branched out to Moscow, and opened its first United States offices in New York City.  In May 2016, the Volkswagen Group invested $300 million in Gett.

In 2017 Gett acquired Juno, a ride-hailing company primarily operating in New York City. Gett sold Juno in November 2019 in an agreement with Lyft, that saw Gett form a partnership with Lyft. 

Gett’s marketplace model saw further partnerships with Ola in 2020, and Curb Mobility in 2021.

Strategic partnership with the Volkswagen Group

In May 2016, Volkswagen Group announced that it would invest $300 million in Gett, allowing the company to grow its operations across European markets, as well as marking the first foray into the mobility space by the Volkswagen Group.

See also
Coupa 
 AMEX GBT
 TripActions

References

Transport companies established in 2010
Android (operating system) software
Ridesharing companies
Road transport in Israel
Online companies of Israel
Transport companies of Israel
Israeli inventions
Mergers and acquisitions of Israeli companies
Location-based software